Walter Porritt (19 July 1914 – 1993) was an English professional footballer who played as a winger or an inside forward in the Football League for York City and was on the books of Huddersfield Town without making a league appearance.

References

1914 births
People from Heckmondwike
1993 deaths
English footballers
Association football wingers
Huddersfield Town A.F.C. players
York City F.C. players
English Football League players